The 1993–94 VfL Bochum season was the 56th season in club history.

Review and events
After the club was relegated from the Bundesliga in the previous season club president Ottokar Wüst decided to step down. Wüsts tenure as club president ended on 19 August 1993 when the club members voted Werner Altegoer into office.

Matches

Legend

2. Bundesliga

DFB-Pokal

Intertoto Cup

Squad

Squad and statistics

Squad, appearances and goals scored

Transfers

Summer

In:

Out:

Sources

External links
 1993–94 VfL Bochum season at Weltfussball.de 
 1993–94 VfL Bochum season at kicker.de 
 1993–94 VfL Bochum season at Fussballdaten.de 

Bochum
VfL Bochum seasons